Josh Macleod (born 27 October 1996) is a Welsh rugby union player who plays for the Scarlets as a back-rower. He has been capped for both Wales U20 and Wales.

Club career 
Macleod made his debut for the Scarlets Under 16s in the 2012–13 season, followed soon after by the Wales U16 squad, while attending Ysgol Bro Gwaun in Fishguard. He subsequently played for Crymych RFC.

Macleod made his debut for Llanelli RFC against Pontypridd in September 2015. After making a further 3 appearances that season, scoring two tries in the process, Macleod went on to make his Scarlets debut against Munster.

At the end of the 2018–19 season, Macleod was voted the Scarlets ‘D Machine’ which meant he was voted their best defensive player.

International career 
Macleod repsented the Wales U20 team in 2016, making 3 appearances for them.

On 6 October 2020 Macleod was named in the senior Wales squad for the 2020 Autumn Nations Cup. Macleod was injured prior to the campaign and did not play.

On 20 January he was named in the senior Wales squad for the 2021 Six Nations campaign. He was named in the Wales team to play Scotland, but was injured in training and unable to make his debut.

Macleod was named in the Wales squad for the 2022 Autumn series.

On 19 November 2022, Macleod made his long awaited debut, starting at Number 8 against Georgia.

References

External links
 WRU profile
 Scarlets profile

1996 births
Living people
Welsh rugby union players
Rugby union flankers
Llanelli RFC players
Scarlets players
Wales international rugby union players